Vincerò is the debut album by French singer Amaury Vassili.  It was released on 6 February 2009. The album reached number 9 on the French Albums Chart. The album went double platinum and sold over 250,000 copies in France.

Track listing

Chart performance

Release history

References

2009 debut albums
Amaury Vassili albums